Highland single malts are single malt Scotch whiskies produced in the Highland region of Scotland. This categorisation includes the whiskies produced on the islands around the perimeter of Scotland (the Island single malts), except for Islay (see Islay whisky). Incongruously, the area also includes certain lowland areas in the North-East of the country such as Banffshire and Aberdeenshire.

Legal status
Highland is a "protected locality" for Scotch Whisky distilling under UK Government legislation.

List of Highland single malt distilleries

 AnCnoc
 Aberfeldy
 Ardmore
 Balblair
 Ben Nevis
 Blair Athol
 Clynelish
 Dalmore
 Dalwhinnie
 Deanston
 Drumguish
 Edradour
 Glencadam
 Glen Deveron
 Glen Eden
 Glendronach
 Glenfoyle
 Glen Garioch
 Glengoyne
 Glenmorangie
 Singleton of Glen Ord
 Glenturret
 Knockdhu
 Loch Lomond
 Loch Morar
 Macphail
 McClelland
 Millburn
 Oban
 Old Fettercairn
 Old Pulteney
 Royal Brackla
 Royal Lochnagar
 Teaninich
 Tullibardine
 Tomatin
 Wolfburn

References

Alcohol-related lists
Scottish malt whisky
Scottish cuisine-related lists
Lists of drinks